The Portrait of Francesco delle Opere is a painting by the Italian Renaissance artist Perugino, dating to 1494 and housed in the Uffizi Gallery, Florence.

History

The first mention of the painting is in the inventory of Cardinal  Leopoldo de' Medici's artworks, as a work of  "Second Manner Raphael". In the 19th century it was attributed to  Perugino and  Jacopo Francia, and then again to Perugino by  Antonio Ramirez de Montalvo, who discovered an inscription in the rear. This reads: "1494 DI LVGLIO PIETRO PERVGINO PINSE FRANC[ESC]O DEL LOPRE PEYNAGA".

It was long considered a self-portrait, and from 1883 it was therefore  exhibited in the gallery of self-portraits in the Vasarian Corridor. In 1881 the subject was finally  identified as   Francesco delle Opere (died 1516), a gem carver and a friend of Perugino.

Description
Francesco delle Opere is portrayed from three-quarters, with a black beret and a mantle of the same color, a red blouse under which is a white shirt. His hand holds  a cartouche with the words Timete Devm ("Beware of God"), the beginning of a famous preaching by Girolamo Savonarola. The hands lie  on an invisible parapet which coincides with the painting's lower border, as in Flemish contemporary works such as Hans Memling's Man with a Letter.

Aside from the attention to details (typical of contemporary Flemish art), the painting share with Memling's also the presence of a city with pointed towers on the left. The presence of small trees and a lake in the background landscape are typical of the Umbrian school of the period.

See also
Portrait of Lorenzo di Credi
Portrait of Perugino

Sources

External links
Page at Florence's museums website
High definition image at Googleart

Francesco delle Opere
Paintings by Pietro Perugino in the Uffizi
1494 paintings